Howes is a subsidiary summit of Branstree in the English Lake District, south east of Selside Pike in Cumbria. It is the subject of a chapter of Wainwright's book The Outlying Fells of Lakeland. Wainwright states that Howes is "merely a subsidiary and undistinguished summit on the broad eastern flank of Barnstree. There is nothing exciting about it ..." but commends the sight of Mosedale quarry and the waterfalls of Swindale Head which he describes as "extremely fine, up to Lodore standard".

References

 

Fells of the Lake District